Madeleine Elise Westerhout (born October 8, 1990) is the former Director of Oval Office Operations at the White House from February to August 2019. Prior to that, from 2017 to 2019, she served as the Personal Secretary to U.S. President Donald Trump. She was fired on August 29, 2019, after Trump learned she had shared details of the Trump family and Oval Office operations with reporters during an off the record dinner earlier that month.

Early life and education
Westerhout was born in Newport Beach, California, and spent most of her time growing up in Irvine, California. She studied at the College of Charleston in Charleston, South Carolina, receiving a BA degree in political science in 2013. After her graduation, she moved to Washington, D.C., and worked as a fitness trainer in the Pure Barre gym of Carrie Rezabek Dorr.

Career
In the 2012 presidential election, Westerhout worked for the campaign of Mitt Romney. In 2013, she worked for candidate John Kuhn in the Republican primary for the special election in South Carolina's first congressional district. Later that year, she interned for Congressman John Campbell. In the summer of 2013, Westerhout began working for the Republican National Committee and the Republican Party Organizing Committee. From January 2015, she worked as an assistant to RNC chief of staff Katie Walsh.

On January 19, 2017, Donald Trump's transition team announced that Westerhout would serve as special assistant and executive assistant to the President. A June 2018 release of White House salary data revealed that Westerhout was paid US$130,000 for the position. She was promoted to Director of Oval Office Operations on February 2, 2019.

In February 2019, Westerhout called a leak of Trump's schedule a "disgraceful breach of trust."

On August 29, 2019, she was fired after it was revealed that she had shared details about Trump's family and White House operations to reporters - reportedly while intoxicated - at an off-the-record dinner. Politico reported she was fired because she boasted of having a better relationship with Trump than his daughters did, and that she said Trump disliked being photographed with daughter  Tiffany Trump because he considered her overweight.

Two days later, Trump posted a tweet in which he cited Westerhout's "fully enforceable confidentiality agreement" but clarified that Westerhout "is a very good person and I don’t think there would ever be reason to use it." In the same tweet, Trump claimed that Westerhout "called me yesterday to apologize, had a bad night. I fully understood and forgave her!"

Bibliography

See also

Timeline of the Donald Trump presidency (2017 Q1)
Timeline of the Donald Trump presidency (2019 Q2)
Timeline of the Donald Trump presidency (2019 Q3)

References 

1990 births
20th-century American women
21st-century American women
College of Charleston alumni
Living people
People from Irvine, California
People from Newport Beach, California
Personal secretaries to the President of the United States
Trump administration personnel
Washington, D.C., Republicans
South Carolina Republicans